Vrána (feminine: Vránová) is a Czech surname meaning "crow". It may refer to:

 Alena Vránová (born 1932), Czech actress
 Jakub Vrána (born 1996), Czech ice hockey player
 Josef Vrana (1905–87), Czech Roman Catholic bishop
 Pavel Vrána (born 1985), Czech footballer
 Petr Vrána (born 1985, Czech ice hockey player
 Vlasta Vrána (born 1950), Norway-Canadian actor

See also
 
 

Czech-language surnames